The Rawdon T-1 was a United States light single-engined civil utility aircraft of the 1950s.

Development
Herb Rawdon had been chief engineer of Travel Air, and later Beech Aircraft in Wichita, Kansas. He left Beech and with his brother Gene, established the Rawdon Brothers Aircraft firm.

In 1938 they designed a low-wing two-seat trainer, the Rawdon R-1. A single example was constructed, but was not ordered, as hoped, by the Civil Pilot Training Programme. Postwar, the firm developed and built a similar, but higher-powered model, the T-1.

Operational history

Rawdon built 35 Model T-1s in five variants.  The major commercial use of the aircraft was as a trainer and in crop spraying, but it also found other utility uses such as aerial banner towing for advertising purposes. Four examples of the T-1M military version were delivered to the Colombian Air Force. Many aircraft were re-fitted with more powerful engines including the Lycoming O-320 series of 150 h.p.

On display

A 1949 Rawdon T-1 is owned by the Kansas Aviation Museum collection.

Variants

T-1   Initial trainer version powered by a Lycoming O-290-C2 engine of 125 h.p.  (13 built);
T-1CS   Crop-spraying version of the T-1 with belly tank and spray equipment buried in the wing structure (2 built);
T-1M  Military version delivered to the Colombian Air Force (4 built);
T-1S  Crop spraying model similar to the T-1CS (9 built);
T-1SD  single-seat  crop sprayer with chemical hopper in place of the rear seat, squared-off wingtips with endplates and modified vertical tail. (7 built).

Specifications (T-1SD)

References
Notes

Bibliography

1940s United States civil utility aircraft
Low-wing aircraft
Single-engined tractor aircraft
Aircraft first flown in 1947